Mount Stanley is the third-highest mountain in Africa.

Mount Stanley may also refer to:

Antarctica 
 Mount Stanley (Antarctica)

Australia 
 Mount Stanley, Queensland, a locality in the Somerset Region, Queensland
 Mount Stanley (Great Dividing Range), in Queensland
 Mount Stanley (King Island), in Tasmania

Canada 
 Mount Stanley (Canadian Rockies), in British Columbia
 Mount Stanley (Valkyr Range), in British Columbia

See also
 Mount Stanley Baldwin, in British Columbia, Canada
Stanley (disambiguation)